Greater Than One is an English electronic music band, founded by husband and wife Michael Wells and Lee Newman in 1985.  They released many albums under this name, and also under the names Tricky Disco, GTO, John + Julie, Church of Extacy, Signs of Chaos, T.D.5, Salami Brothers, Killout Squad, Technohead and L.E.D.. Only a few of their singles were commercially successful.  Since Newman's death on 4 August 1995 from cancer, Wells continues to release music under some of these names, and also as The Man and S.O.L.O.

1985: Greater Than One
In 1985, Newman and Wells met at the Royal College of Art in London, formed Greater Than One, and released their first album Kill the Pedagogue on cassette.  During the late 1980s they organised art installations and exhibitions accompanied by their own music: "When the whole audience were in, we started a soundtrack ... war sirens and searchlights. This was designed to disorientate the audience, throwing them into an unexpected nightmare. After the shock, Islamic chanting began which then changed to Song For England, during which we came onstage wearing illuminous skull masks...". They formed their own label Kunst=Kapital and released four further albums under this alias between 1987 and 1990.

1990: First hits
Their first hit single was the trance record "Pure" as GTO on Chrysalis Records, a club hit around Europe, closely followed by "Tricky Disco" as Tricky Disco on Warp Records, which peaked at number 14 in the UK Singles Chart in July 1990.

They used many aliases because, releasing so much material, they feared the press would not write about it all, if they knew it all came from the same band. As Newman said, "if you give them a Tricky Disco one week and then a John and Julie two weeks later and GTO a month later they’ll write about all of it". Their aliases also allowed them to release different types of material on different record labels. The single "Double Happiness" as John and Julie appeared on XL Recordings; the 12 inch single "Listen to the rhythm flow" as GTO was released on Jumping Man Records in 1991; the 1993 Tip of the Iceberg album as GTO was released on REACT, and the 1995 album Headsex as Technohead appeared on Mokum Records.

1995: Technohead
Headsex contained their biggest hit, "I Wanna Be a Hippy". The remix by Flamman & Abraxas was accompanied by a video featuring three youths with shaved heads, wearing Mokum T-shirts and carrying inflatable hammers, chasing a hippy on a bicycle around a park in Amsterdam. However, Newman later died that year in August, after a brief battle with cancer. It reached number 1 in 12 countries including Germany, Netherlands, Belgium and Switzerland, and number 6 in the UK in February 1996, which culminated in two performances on Top of the Pops in January and February of the same year.

Two Technohead follow-up singles followed in 1996. "Happy Birthday" fared mildly well in Europe, cracking the top 20 in the UK and Finland in April at No. 18 and No. 20, respectively, reached the top 40 in Ireland and the Netherlands with peaks at No. 23 and No. 28, respectively, and managed to chart in Germany at No. 100. The follow-up single, "Banana-na-na", which was released in October, cracked the top 40 in the Netherlands at No. 38 and peaked at No. 64 in the UK.

Wells has recorded many singles and three more albums since, including two Tricky Disco singles in February 2007 and two Technohead singles in 2010 and 2014, both of which were released on Mokum Records.

In 2019, Wells returned to Mokum Records to release the song "Hands Up!" in order to commemorate the label's 200th release and also to release the "Wasted EP" as MOK202.

Discography

Studio albums

Greater Than One
Kill the Pedagogue (1985)
All the Masters Licked Me (1987)
Trust (recorded 1987 as the first attempt of All the Masters Licked Me)
Dance of the Cowards (1988)
London (1989)
G-Force (1989)
Index (1991) (EP)
Duty + Trust (1991 - recorded 1987/1988)

GTO
Tip of the Iceberg (1993)

Church of Extacy
Technohead (1993)

Technohead
Headsex (1995)
Wasted (EP) (2019)

Signs Ov Chaos
Frankenscience (1996)

The Man
Phunk Box (1997)

Signs of Chaos
Departure (1998)

S.O.L.O.
Out Is In (1999)

Singles

Technohead

References

External links
Official site

1985 establishments in England
Musical groups established in 1985
English techno music groups
English electronic music groups
Hardcore techno music groups
Wax Trax! Records artists